Ada Estate is a primarily residential suburb of Dar es Salaam (Tanzania). In this suburb there are several embassies, including the French embassy; the American embassy was also in Ada Estate before being transferred after the 1998 United States embassy bombings. The suburb also includes some of the most advanced hospitals in Dar es Salaam, including the Tanzania Heart Institute (the only Tanzanian hospital specialized in cardiology).

External links
 Tanzania Heart Institute

Geography of Dar es Salaam